Acemhöyük is an archaeological site in Turkey. The tell is located near the village of Yeşilova in Merkez district, Aksaray Province. The site was an Assyrian trading colony, or Karum.

Location 
Acemhöyük is located 18 km northwest of Aksaray, on the southeastern end of the Tuz Gölü, in a fertile plain on the Uluirmak or Melendiz. The ruins are arranged, like those of Kültepe, into two parts: a settlement on a hill, measuring 700 m east-west and 600 m north-south, and a lower city, which is partially covered by the modern village of Yeşilova. According to Nimet Özgüc, the extent of the lower city is of a similar size. The highest point, the citadel, rises 20 metres above the surrounding land and is now called Sarikaya (yellow cliff) on account of the gleaming yellow mudbricks. The tell is to the south of the modern village and in the centre of it there was (or is?) a modern cemetery.

Date 
The final settlement layer dates to the Greaco-Roman period and consists of the foundations of habitations. The stratigraphy below this begins in the Karum period and consists of five layers, numbered from top to bottom, I to V. Layer I is mostly destroyed, which is attributed to its proximity to the surface. Some kilns and building remains have been found. The houses of layer II appear to have been built of wood and mudbrick on the ruins of Layer III in a hurry, according to Nimet Özgüc. Layer III itself was heavily damaged by fire, but appears to have represented the period of greatest prosperity for the site. Layers IV and V are unexplored, or at least unpublished, but presumably belong to the pre-Karum period.

In 2016 new research using carbon dating and dendrology on timber used in this site and the palace in Kültepe show the felling dates for primary construction of the Sarıkaya Palace at Acemhöyük are placed at RY730-731 on the MBA chronology. RY732 equates with 1793–1784 BCE (68.2% hpd; the 95.4% hpd is 1797–1781 BCE). This research shows that middle or low-middle chronology are the only remaining possible chronologies that fit these new data.

Research history
Excavation of Acemhöyük began in 1962 under the General Directorate of Antiquities and Museums in conjunction with the University of Ankara. From 1962 to 1988, Nimet Özgüç led the excavations. Since 1989, the project has been led by Aliye Öztan. Some the finds are on display in the Aksaray Museum; others are displayed at the Niğde Archaeological Museum.

History
No narrative history of Acemhöyük can be written. Layers IV and V belong to the period before the Assyrians established karum settlements in central Anatolia. Layer III belongs to the karum period and represents the height of the settlement's prosperity, but it was destroyed by fire. The cause of this fire cannot be determined. Settlement on the hill ceased after this until it was resettled in the Hellenistic or Roman period.

Architecture

The Sarikaya-Palace 
There is a palace building on the citadel. The western part of the palace has been completely destroyed by later settlement and modern activity. The 1.5-2 metre thick walls are still p to 3.8 metres high in places. The palace must have contained around 50 rooms (the exact number is uncertain due to the subsequent destruction). The northern, eastern and western sides were surrounded by a portico, made of marble bases and wooden pillars. The ground floor of the building was used for storage purposes. Clay bullae were found in all the rooms. It is assumed that the rooms of the officials were on the upper floor, as at Kültepe.

Clay Bullae 
The clay bullae in the Sarikaya Palace included sealings of Shamshi-Adad I, Dugedu (a daughter of Yahdun-Lim of Mari) and King Aplahanda of Carchemish.

Inscription
Inscription on a sealing of Shamshi-Adad:
dUTUsi  dIskur 
Sakin dEnlil
Šamši-Adad Appointee of the god Enlil

Pratt Ivories 

Between 1932 and 1937, a group of 2nd millennium B.C. ivory furniture fittings were donated to the Metropolitan Museum of Art by the collector George D. Pratt. Subsequent scholarship has shown that several of these pieces originally formed part of an elaborate gold and ivory throne, which has been convincingly reconstructed by Elizabeth Simpson. In the 1960s, archaeological excavations of the Sarikaya Palace revealed stylistically similar ivory pieces, including a wing that matched with a falcon in the Pratt collection. Rumors of looting from the site and photographs of the ivories from a nearby dealer have further demonstrated that the pieces originally came from Acemhöyük, where they were looted and eventually sold on the antiquities market. Since their acquisition by the Metropolitan Museum of Art, they have become known as the Pratt Ivories or the Acemhöyük ivories.

See also 
 Yeşilova, Aksaray
 Aksaray

References

Bibliography 
 Özgüç, Nimet, 2015  Acemhöyük - Burus̆haddum I: Silindir mühürler ve mühür baskılı bullalar/Cylinder Seals and Bullae with Cylinder Seal Impressions. Ankara: Türk Tarih Kurumu, Ankara.
 1966 "Excavations at Acemhöyük," Anadolu (Anatolia) 10.
 Aliye Öztan 1979 "Acemhöyük Sarıkaya Sarayında Bulunan İki Taş Tabak/ Two Stone Plates from the Sarıkaya Palace at Açemhöyük" Belleten XLIII/ p. 170, 381-384, 385-388
 1986 "Acemhöyük Taş Kapları" Belleten LII/203 (1988) 393-406 
 1990 "1989 Yılı Acemhöyük Kazıları" XII. Kazı Sonuçları Toplantısı, Cilt I, Ankara, pp. 247-258 
 1992 "1991 Yılı Acemhöyük Kazıları" XIV. Kazı Sonuçları Toplantısı, Cilt I, Ankara, pp. 281-300 
 1993b "1992 Yılı Acemhöyük Kazıları" XV. Kazı Sonuçları Toplantısı, Cilt I, Ankara, pp. 245-255 
 1993c L.Özen – S.Tazegül, "Acemhöyük‘den Bir Grup Gümüş Eser," 1992 Yılı Anadolu Medeniyetleri Müzesi Konferansları, Ankara, pp. 146-149 
 1994 "1993 Acemhöyük Kazıları" XVI. Kazı Sonuçları Toplantısı, Cilt I, Ankara, pp. 189-192 
 1996 "1994 Acemhöyük Kazıları" XVII. Kazı Sonuçları Toplantısı- I, pp. 209-213 
 1997b "Acemhöyük Gümüş Hazinesi" Belleten LXI/ 231, pp. 233-271 
 1997c "Acemhöyük" Eczacıbaşı Sanat Ansiklopedisi, İstanbul, pp. 14-15 
 1998 "Preliminary Report on the Arıbaş Cemetery at Acemhöyük" Essays on Ancient Anatolia in the Second Millennium B.C. Bulletin of the Middle Eastern Culture Center in Japan Vol. X, pp. 167-175 
 1999 M.G.Drahor- M. Bayrak- O.M.İlkışık ile birlikte, "Acemhöyük'ten Manyetik ve Elektromanyetik -VLF Sonuçlari / Magnetic and Electromagnetic –VLF Results from Acemhöyük." DEÜ Mühendislik Fakültesi, Fen ve Mühendislik Dergisi. Cilt: 1 Sayi 2, pp. 81-99 
 2001 "1998-1999 Acemhöyük Kazıları" 22. Kazı Sonuçları Toplantısı I (Ankara), pp. 119-128 
 2002 "2000 Yılı Acemhöyük Kazıları" 23. Kazı Sonuçları Toplantısı 2. Cilt. Ankara, pp. 327-334 
 "Acemhöyük Kazıları 2001" 24. Kazı Sonuçları Toplantısı (Kültür Bakanlığı, baskıda)

External links 
 Acemhöyük -- Ancient Anatolian City of Acemhoyuk-Aksaray transanatolie.com
 (Turkish) TransAnatolie - Purushattum - Purushottam - Purushanda - Acemhöyuk - Yeşilova - Aksaray transanatolie.com -- (English translation)

Archaeological sites of ancient Anatolia
Archaeological sites in Central Anatolia
History of Aksaray Province
Ancient Assyrian cities